The RAF Hal Far airfield was the first permanent airfield to be built on Malta. It was opened on 1 April 1929 as HMS Falcon, a Royal Navy stone frigate, and was used by Fleet Air Arm crews. It was transferred to the Maltese Government and redeveloped from January 1979. It is now closed and one of its runways is used by drag racing enthusiasts. The second runway is now a road leading to an industrial estate which was developed recently. The Maltese fire service, the CPD occupy the newer building with the glass control tower on the roof. The old Royal Naval Air Station building is now occupied by the International Safety Training College who utilise part of the runway for firefighting training.

Runways
This airfield consisted of two runways, namely Runway 13/31 which was 6,000 ft (2,000 yards) long and Runway 9/27, which was 4,800 ft (1,600 yards) long. Runway 13/31 was resurfaced between 20 April and 26 May 1959 while the resurfacing of Runway 9/27 was carried out between 12 June and 28 July 1959. Its location on Malta was of great strategic importance in the Mediterranean, since it provided a base for aircraft carrier units en route to the rest of the British Empire. Compared to other airstrips on the island, Hal Far had better approaches over the sea and was the preferred diversionary base. It also provided excellent range facilities, making it the ideal location for armament training by the squadrons.

Facilities
Hal Far airfield provided various facilities, including an armoury, explosives area, workshops, a compass base and a control tower. It had also a radar test base and a number of hangars. It also included living quarters for H.Q. Staff, Officers and other ranks, and a sick bay, for medical purposes.

World War II

During the Second World War, Hal Far airfield was one of the main targets for the Luftwaffe and the Regia Aeronautica and suffered several bombings during the blitz. On July and August 1940 in the beginning of the Siege of Malta, the Italian air-raids managed to damage several squadron aircraft. As the raids  intensified during 1942 more damage was inflicted on the airfield and the squadrons, present on the airfield. On one particular attack on Hal Far by Junkers Ju 88s, a Fairey Swordfish was badly damaged. Further raids during January 1942 resulted in the destruction at Hal Far of two other Swordfish and a Blackburn Skua, and damaged 15 Hurricanes, three other Swordfish and a Fairey Fulmar. Further damage to aircraft, airfield buildings and loss of personnel resulted during attacks in 1942 and 1943, with the last bombing being recorded on 21 May 1943.

Hal Far had been the first Maltese airfield to be bombed on 11 June 1940. During this period, 2,300 tons of bombs were dropped on the airfield, nevertheless it was never made unserviceable, due to the efficiency of the airfield repair parties. On the airfield itself the ground crew casualties numbered 30 killed and 84 injured. Various officers and Maltese civilian employees were awarded the George Cross, George Medal and other awards for their courage and bravery in the face of enemy action.
With enemy air raids practically at an end, and as aircraft became heavier and traffic had increased significantly, paved runways and taxiways were added to the airfield, together with the completion of runways 13/31 and 9/27.

Post war
The Air Sea Rescue and Communications Flight, which had originally formed at Hal Far in March 1943, but which moved to Ta' Qali the following September, returned to Hal Far in March 1944.
By 1944 Malta had therefore returned to normal and new aircraft were appearing all over the Island. The influx of large numbers of aircraft needed an expansion of dispersal areas and more huts, an undertaking carried out in October 1944. Further accommodation areas were added when FAA squadrons started arriving regularly at Hal Far for training periods.

A different kind of event occurred in January 1945, when British Prime Minister Winston Churchill and US President Franklin D. Roosevelt came to Malta in anticipation of the Malta Conference with Soviet Premier Joseph Stalin. To deter any possible enemy attack, nine Spitfire IXs of No. 1435 Squadron, and six Mosquito night fighters of No. 256 Squadron, deployed to Hal Far from Grottaglie and Foggia respectively, two of the Mosquitos escorting the Prime Minister's Avro York transport aircraft outside Malta and into Luqa airfield on 29 January. All aircraft remained at Hal Far into early February until all VIPs had left.

After the evolution from piston to jet engines in the 1950s, the airfield had to be closed for three weeks for the resurfacing of the runways. The airfield started housing various training camps by the UK-based Royal Naval Volunteer Reserve (RNVR) Air Divisions. Training including live depth charges dropping, live armament practice and rocket firing on the uninhabited islet of Filfla, and hide and seek exercises with RN submarines in which aircraft sought out and shadowed the underwater 'raiders' and finally carried out mock attacks if they managed to find them. Several units used HMS Falcon for these annual summer camps, which started in 1950, stopped in 1951, and continued from 1952 to 1956.

During 1957, the airfield also served as a civilian airport while the runways at RAF Luqa were being resurfaced. During 1958 Hal Far was the proving base for the world's first assault helicopter squadron.

After being used by the Royal Navy, the Hal Far airfield was returned to the RAF for a short period of time in the mid and 1960s, and the last squadron was disbanded on 31 August 1967. This brought to an end 43 very active years of Malta's oldest and most historical airfield. It was subsequently placed on a 'care and maintenance' basis and served as a satellite for RAF Luqa. Between March 1967 and September 1978 the airfield served as a base for the American aircraft maintenance company M.I.A.Co.

During the resurfacing of Luqa's runways, all civilian and military flying was transferred to Hal Far until Luqa became operational again.

On 5 August 2010, the Employment & Training Corporation inaugurated an Underground Sick Bay which lies within the premises. This has been turned into a museum emphasising the period from 1923 to 1945. The website gives an insight of the Museum. A number of model aircraft 1/72 scale have been built by a number of enthusiasts which shows some of the aircraft that landed at Hal Far in this period.

Units

 No. 22 Squadron RAF
 No. 38 Squadron RAF
 No. 43 Squadron RAF
 No. 72 Squadron RAF
 No. 73 Squadron RAF
 No. 74 Squadron RAF
 No. 93 Squadron RAF
 No. 108 Squadron RAF
 No. 185 Squadron RAF
 No. 208 Squadron RAF
 No. 229 Squadron RAF
 No. 242 Squadron RAF
 No. 243 Squadron RAF
 No. 249 Squadron RAF
 No. 250 Squadron RAF
 No. 255 Squadron RAF
 No. 283 Squadron RAF
 No. 284 Squadron RAF
 No. 605 Squadron RAF
 No. 624 Squadron RAF
 No. 1435 Squadron RAF
 Air Headquarters Malta Communication Squadron RAF (1946-) was formed here by redesignating Air Headquarters Matla Communication Flight (1944-46)
 Malta Air Sea Rescue and Communication Flight RAF (1943) became Malta Communication, Ferry Unit and Air Sea Rescue Flight RAF

Closure

With the transfer of the airfield to the Maltese Government, who planned to convert Hal Far airfield into an industrial area, MIACO was asked to vacate its hangars and offices by September 1978. Both runways have been dug up and further development of the area reduced the airfield to a scar on the land. Runway 13/31 is currently being used by the Malta Drag Racing Association as a quarter mile dragstrip. Runway 9/27 is now a public road linking the various sections of the industrial area. Its scar can still be clearly seen on Google Maps when using the satellite image function. The control tower and the officer's quarters are still intact, together with a few Nissen huts. The kitchens and mess halls, the electricians and radio section cabin are still standing, but in a dilapidated state.

Other parts of the airfield such as the hangar have been transformed into a refugee camp .

See also
RAF Luqa

References

Citations
H.M.S. Falcon - RNAS. Hal Far
Aviation In Malta
Malta GC - A contribution in keeping the memory alive
Hal Far Airfield info & Photos
Hal Far - A Full Account

Bibliography

Hal
Hal
Defunct airports
Airports in Malta
Military installations of Malta
Birżebbuġa
Malta–United Kingdom military relations
Airports disestablished in 1978